Halady Srinivas Shetty (born 6 April 1951) is a five-term MLA from Kundapur. He quit the Bharatiya Janata Party in 2012, after denial of ministerial berth, but rejoined the party  before the 2018 assembly election. He is fondly called as "'''ಕುಂದಾಪುರದ ವಾಜಪೇಯಿ (Vajapayee of Kundapura)'''" due to his simplicity.

References 

Bharatiya Janata Party politicians from Karnataka
Living people
Karnataka MLAs 2008–2013
People from Udupi district
Karnataka MLAs 2018–2023
Karnataka MLAs 1999–2004
Karnataka MLAs 2004–2007
Karnataka MLAs 2013–2018
1951 births